Narrawa, New South Wales is a civil parish of King County, New South Wales. ).

Narrawa is on the Lachlan River between Rugby and Crookwell, New South Wales.

References

Parishes of King County (New South Wales)
Upper Lachlan Shire